Iliana Rupert (born 12 July 2001) is a French basketball player for the Atlanta Dream of the Women's National Basketball Association (WNBA), for the Tango Bourges Basket and the French national team.

She is the daughter of Thierry Rupert, former power forward of the French national team.

She represented France at the FIBA Women's EuroBasket 2019.

WNBA career statistics

Regular season

|-
|style="text-align:left;background:#afe6ba;"| 2022†
| align="left" | Las Vegas
| 17 || 0 || 13.1 || .463 || .368 || .333 || 2.3 || 0.9 || 0.4 || 0.0 || 0.5 || 3.8
|-
| align="left" | Career
| align="left" | 1 year, 1 team
| 17 || 0 || 13.1 || .463 || .368 || .333 || 2.3 || 0.9 || 0.4 || 0.0 || 0.5 || 3.8

Playoffs

|-
|style="text-align:left;background:#afe6ba;"| 2022†
| align="left" | Las Vegas
| 7 || 0 || 7.0 || .313 || .357 || .000 || 0.4 || 0.0 || 0.0 || 0.1 || 0.4 || 2.1
|-
| align="left" | Career
| align="left" | 1 year, 1 team
| 7 || 0 || 7.0 || .313 || .357 || .000 || 0.4 || 0.0 || 0.0 || 0.1 || 0.4 || 2.1

References

External links

2001 births
Living people
Centers (basketball)
French women's basketball players
France women's national basketball team players
Las Vegas Aces draft picks
Olympic basketball players of France
People from Sèvres
Basketball players at the 2020 Summer Olympics
Medalists at the 2020 Summer Olympics
Olympic medalists in basketball
Olympic bronze medalists for France